Leitbild is the tenth studio album from German futurepop band Blutengel, released on 17 February 2017. It was released as a single CD, two-disc digipak with a bonus disc, and a collector's edition box set with the two disc album and a shaped MCD that features a rework of "Anders Sein" plus two songs off Leitbild in symphonic and acoustic versions. It also has two disc audiobook of Chris Pohl's Lebe Deinen Traum.

Leitbild was preceded by the single "Complete", and later Lebe Deinen Traum, both with accompanying music videos directed by Peter Dommaschk.

Track listing

Charts

References

External links

2017 albums
Blutengel albums